Viktor Georgievich Bushuev (18 May 1933 – 25 April 2003) was a Soviet and Russian weightlifter. During his career, he won three world titles (1957–1959) and an Olympic gold medal (1960), and set three official and two unofficial world records, all in the total.

Bushuev was selected to the national team in 1955 and dominated his 67.5 kg weight category until 1960. He retired in 1964 after failing the national trials for the Olympic team and became a weightlifting coach in his native Nizhny Novgorod.

References

External links
WeightliftingExchange.com
Viktor Bushuev Wins 1958 World Weightlifting Championships – Lightweights

1933 births
2003 deaths
Honoured Masters of Sport of the USSR
Recipients of the Order of the Red Banner of Labour
Medalists at the 1960 Summer Olympics
Olympic gold medalists for the Soviet Union
Olympic medalists in weightlifting
Weightlifters at the 1960 Summer Olympics
World Weightlifting Championships medalists

Olympic weightlifters of the Soviet Union
Russian male weightlifters
Soviet male weightlifters
Sportspeople from Nizhny Novgorod